The 2012–13 Talk 'N Text Tropang Texters season was the 23rd season of the franchise in the Philippine Basketball Association (PBA).

Key dates
 Chot Reyes of the Talk 'N Text Tropang Texters stepped down as head coach at the end of the 2011–12 season due to his appointment as head coach of Smart Gilas. Team consultant Norman Black has been appointed as head coach starting this season. Due to Black's commitments as head coach of the Ateneo Blue Eagles in the UAAP, assistant coach Nash Racela will serve as interim head coach until the UAAP basketball tournament ends.
August 19: The 2012 PBA Draft took place in Robinson's Midtown Mall, Manila.
October 20: Norman Black formally took over as head coach, replacing interim coach Nash Racela.

Draft picks

Roster

Philippine Cup

Eliminations

Standings

Game log

|- bgcolor="#bbffbb" 
| 1
|  October 5
|  Meralco
|  112–110*
|  Dillinger (20)
|  Peek (9)
|  Dillinger, Castro, Reyes (5)
|  Smart Araneta Coliseum
|  1–0
|  Boxscore
|- bgcolor="#bbffbb" 
| 2
|  October 12
|  GlobalPort
|  108–104
|  Castro (30)
|  de Ocampo (9)
|  Alapag (6)
|  Smart Araneta Coliseum
|  2–0
|  Boxscore
|- bgcolor="#bbffbb" 
| 3
|  October 17
|  Air21
|  96–89
|  de Ocampo (19)
|  Williams (13)
|  Alapag, Castro (4)
|  Mall of Asia Arena
|  3–0
|  Boxscore
|- bgcolor="#bbffbb" 
| 4
|  October 20
|  San Mig Coffee
|  85–74
|  Fonacier (26)
|  Williams (12)
|  Castro (5)
|  Ynares Center
|  4–0
|  Boxscore
|- bgcolor="#bbffbb" 
| 5
|  October 24
|  Barako Bull
|  79–76
|  Castro (15)
|  Williams (13)
|  Reyes (6)
|  Smart Araneta Coliseum
|  5–0
|  Boxscore
|- bgcolor="#bbffbb" 
| 6
|  October 27
|  Rain or Shine
|  80–77
|  Alapag (15)
|  Williams (12)
|  Alapag (7)
| Victorias City
|  6–0
|  Boxscore

|- bgcolor="#edbebf" 
| 7
|  November 2
|  Alaska
|  92–94
|  Alapag (17)
|  Williams (9)
|  Reyes (7)
|  Smart Araneta Coliseum
|  6–1
|  Boxscore
|- bgcolor="#bbffbb" 
| 8
|  November 7
|  Petron Blaze
|  92–82
|  Fonacier (21)
|  Castro (9)
|  Alapag, Castro (5)
|  Smart Araneta Coliseum
|  7–1
|  Boxscore
|- bgcolor="#edbebf" 
| 9
|  November 11
|  Barangay Ginebra
|  101–104
|  de Ocampo (20)
|  de Ocampo (10)
|  Castro (7)
|  Mall of Asia Arena
|  7–2
|  Boxscore
|- bgcolor="#bbffbb" 
| 10
|  November 16
|  Meralco
|  109–98
|  Castro (23)
|  Reyes (8)
|  Alapag (7)
|  Ynares Center
|  8–2
|  Boxscore
|- bgcolor="#bbffbb" 
| 11
|  November 21
|  San Mig Coffee
|  92–63
|  Alapag (19)
|  Williams (11)
|  Castro (7)
|  Smart Araneta Coliseum
|  9–2
|  Boxscore
|- bgcolor="#bbffbb" 
| 12
|  November 25
|  Air21
|  100–94
|  Alapag (18)
|  Fonacier (9)
|  Alapag (6)
|  Smart Araneta Coliseum
|  10–2
|  Boxscore
|- bgcolor="#bbffbb" 
| 13
|  November 28
|  Petron Blaze
|  95–82
|  Castro (23)
|  Williams (9)
|  Castro (5)
|  Smart Araneta Coliseum
|  11–2
|  Boxscore

|- bgcolor="#bbffbb" 
| 14
|  December 9
|  Barangay Ginebra
|  87–80
|  Castro (24)
|  Peek (18)
|  Castro (5)
|  Smart Araneta Coliseum
|  12–2
|  Boxscore

Playoffs

Bracket

Game log

|- bgcolor="#bbffbb" 
| 1
|  December 13
|  Air21
|  105–100
|  Reyes, Fonacier (16)
|  Reyes (9)
|  Alapag (6)
|  Smart Araneta Coliseum
|  1–0
|  Boxscore

|- bgcolor="#bbffbb"
| 1
|  December 19
|  Alaska
|  66–65
|  Castro (17)
|  Castro (11)
|  Alapag (3)
|  Smart Araneta Coliseum
|  1–0
|  Boxscore
|- bgcolor="#edbebf" 
| 2
|  December 21
|  Alaska
|  88–100
|  Dillinger (26)
|  Peek, Carey (6)
|  Alapag (6)
|  Mall of Asia Arena
|  1–1
|  Boxscore
|- bgcolor="#bbffbb"
| 3
|  December 26
|  Alaska
|  93–79
|  Williams (23)
|  Williams (9)
|  Alapag (11)
|  Mall of Asia Arena
|  2–1
|  Boxscore
|- bgcolor="#edbebf"
| 4
|  December 28
|  Alaska
|  99–104
|  Alapag (17)
|  Williams (11)
|  Alapag, Castro (5)
|  Mall of Asia Arena
|  2–2
|  Boxscore
|- bgcolor="#bbffbb"
| 5
|  December 30
|  Alaska
|  99–95
|  Reyes (15)
|  Williams (9)
|  Alapag, Castro (5)
|  Mall of Asia Arena
|  3–2
|  
|- bgcolor="#bbffbb"
| 6
|  January 4
|  Alaska
|  83–78
|  Castro (16)
|  Williams (10)
|  Castro (4)
|  Cuneta Astrodome
|  4–2
|  Boxscore

|- bgcolor="#bbffbb" 
| 1
|  January 9
|  Rain or Shine
|  87–81
|  Castro, de Ocampo (16)
|  Williams (12)
|  Alapag (6)
|  Smart Araneta Coliseum
|  1–0
|  Boxscore
|- bgcolor="#bbffbb" 
| 2
|  January 11
|  Rain or Shine
|  89–81
|  de Ocampo (30)
|  de Ocampo (9)
|  de Ocampo, Alapag (4)
|  Mall of Asia Arena
|  2–0
|  Boxscore
|- bgcolor="#bbffbb" 
| 3
|  January 13
|  Rain or Shine
|  89–80
|  Castro (19)
|  Reyes, Williams, Carey (8)
|  Alapag, Castro (4)
|  Smart Araneta Coliseum
|  3–0
|  Boxscore
|- bgcolor="#bbffbb" 
| 4
|  January 16
|  Rain or Shine
|  105–82
|  de Ocampo (19)
|  Williams (11)
|  Alapag (8)
|  Smart Araneta Coliseum
|  4–0
|  Boxscore

Commissioner's Cup

Eliminations

Standings

Game log

|- bgcolor="#edbebf" 
| 1
|  February 9
|  Meralco
|  92–99
|  Benson (25)
|  Benson (11)
|  Alapag, de Ocampo (5)
|  Smart Araneta Coliseum
|  0–1
|  boxscore
|- bgcolor="#bbffbb" 
| 2
|  February 15
|  Air21
|  86–83
|  Benson (30)
|  Benson (18)
|  Castro, Fonacier (4)
|  Smart Araneta Coliseum
|  1–1
|  boxscore
|- bgcolor="#bbffbb" 
| 3
|  February 20
|  GlobalPort
|  99–79
|  Benson (20)
|  Benson (19)
|  Alapag (7)
|  Smart Araneta Coliseum
|  2–1
|  boxscore
|- bgcolor="#edbebf" 
| 4
|  February 24
|  San Mig Coffee
|  82–90
|  Castro (18)
|  Benson (17)
|  Alapag (5)
|  Smart Araneta Coliseum
|  2–2
|  boxscore

|- bgcolor="#edbebf" 
| 5
|  March 1
|  Alaska
|  69–92
|  Benson (27)
|  Benson (14)
|  Alapag (4)
|  Smart Araneta Coliseum
|  2–3
|  boxscore
|- bgcolor="#bbffbb" 
| 6
|  March 9
|  Barako Bull
|  101–98
|  Al-Hussaini (19)
|  Harvey (10)
|  Alapag (4)
|  Legaspi City, Albay
|  3–3
|  boxscore
|- 
| 7
|  March 13
|  Rain or Shine
|  
|  
|  
|  
|  Smart Araneta Coliseum
|  
|  
|- 
| 8
|  March 17
|  Barangay Ginebra
|  
|  
|  
|  
|  Smart Araneta Coliseum
|  
|  
|- 
| 9
|  March 22
|  Petron Blaze
|  
|  
|  
|  
|  Smart Araneta Coliseum
|  
|

Governors' Cup

Eliminations

Standings

Game log

|- bgcolor= "#bbffbb" 
| 1
|  August 16
|  Barako Bull
|  118–113 (OT)
|  Mitchell (48)
|  Mitchell (11)
|  three players (3)
|  Smart Araneta Coliseum
|  1–0
|  BoxscoreRecap
|- bgcolor="#edbebf"
| 2
|  August 25
|  San Mig Coffee
|  99–118 
|  Mitchell (38)
| 
| 
|  Mall of Asia Arena
|  1–1
|  Recap
|- bgcolor="#edbebf"
| 3
|  August 30
|  Meralco
|  86–92
|  Mitchell (32)
|  Mitchell (11)
|  Castro (7)
|  Smart Araneta Coliseum
|  1–2
|  BoxscoreRecap

|- bgcolor="#bbffbb"
| 4
|  September 1
|  GlobalPort
|  102–95
|  Mitchell (35)
|  Al-Hussaini (15)
|  Reyes (7)
|  Mall of Asia Arena
|  2–2
|  BoxscoreRecap
|- bgcolor=
| 5
|  September 6
|  Alaska
| 
| 
| 
| 
|  Mall of Asia Arena
| 
| 
|- bgcolor=
| 6
|  September 7
|  Petron
| 
| 
| 
| 
|  Smart Araneta Coliseum
| 
| 
|- bgcolor=
| 7
|  September 13
|  Air21
| 
| 
| 
| 
|  PhilSports Arena
| 
| 
|- bgcolor=
| 8
|  September 18
|  Rain or Shine
| 
| 
| 
| 
|  Cuneta Astrodome
| 
| 
|- bgcolor=
| 9
|  September 22
|  Barangay Ginebra
| 
| 
| 
| 
|  Mall of Asia Arena
| 
|

Transactions

Trades

Pre-season
None

Philippine Cup
None

Commissioner's Cup

Governors' Cup

Recruited imports

References

TNT Tropang Giga seasons
Talk 'N Text